Tulay, also rendered as Tiula, may refer to:
 Tulay-e Bala
 Tulay-e Pain

See also
Tülay